The Museum of Folk Life is located at Georgievskaya Street 55, Mariupol, Ukraine. It displays the peculiarities of everyday life of representatives of different nationalities who inhabited the Azov region between the 18th and the beginning of the 20th century. The exposition is based on ethnography and the most widely represented cultures were those of Ukrainians and Greeks.

History
The museum was opened in 1989 as a branch of the Mariupol Museum of Local Lore through the reorganization of the museum.

The museum is located in the building which, since 1969, had contained the house-museum of A. Zhdanov.

Between 1995 and 2001, the museum received a new exposition regarding the pre-Soviet era through reorganisation of Mariupol Museum of Local Lore.

Exhibits
The displays include over 5,000 exhibits and reveals the features of a typical household and life of the time from the 18th to the beginning of the 20th century.

Presented objects include tools, household items, including clothing, fabrics, jewelry, utensils, furniture of Ukrainians, Russians, Greeks, Jews and Germans. An open-air complex, including a mill, smithy, and pottery workshop, was built in the yard.

The section "Life and culture of the Jewish population" also elaborates on the celebration of Hanukkah.

Most substantial is the collection that reflects the culture of the Greeks who arrived at the end of the 18th century from the Crimean khanate. It contains carpets, woven wall decorations ("tohma"), embroidered shirts (national costumes) and handkerchiefs used in weddings, women's hats ("periphtar"), as well as jewelry, belts, metal dishes, Easter eggs, and more.

See also

 List of ethnographic museums

References

1989 establishments in Ukraine
Museums established in 1989
Ethnographic museums in Ukraine
Museums in Mariupol
Local museums in Ukraine
Folk museums in Ukraine
Azov